"Renegade" is a song by American rock band Daughtry from their third studio album Break the Spell (2011). It was released September 27, 2011 as the lead album's lead rock single. The song was played on ESPN in November along with two other songs from the album. WWE used "Renegade" to highlight the nominees for "Trending Star of the Year" during the 2011 Slammy Awards on an episode of WWE Raw.

Release
"Renegade", along with "Crawling Back to You" were made available for a free listen on the band's official website on September 19, 2011. It was later released to rock stations September 27, 2011. On October 18, 2011 the songs was made available for purchases via iTunes. A music video was also released featuring the band's live clips from different shows.

Charts

References

2011 singles
Daughtry (band) songs
Song recordings produced by Howard Benson
Songs written by Chris Daughtry
RCA Records singles
2011 songs